見殺し塔からずっと: Live at Shimokitazawa Shelter is the first DVD release by Japanese band Boris. It was captured on their Black Summer tour on July 12, 2003. The first ten tracks are songs from the show, which are mostly from the Akuma no Uta and Heavy Rocks albums. Tracks 11-14 are music videos made by the band by Foodunited and Fangs Anal Satan. A loose translation of the first bit of the title is, "From The Tower That Turns A Blind Eye To Death".

Track listing

References 

Boris (band) video albums
2003 video albums
Live video albums
2003 live albums
Diwphalanx Records albums